Foetz is a small town located in the commune of Mondercange, in south-western Luxembourg. , it has a population of 571 inhabitants.

References

Towns in Luxembourg
Mondercange